WRC II Extreme (also known as WRC 2002) is a 2002 off-road video game released for the PlayStation 2. The game was developed by Evolution Studios and published by Sony Computer Entertainment Europe.

Gameplay
WRC II Extreme contains 115 stages across 15 different countries with officially licensed WRC cars that are available to the player. An action replay mode is made available which includes a wide range of camera angle shots. All 14 rallies from the official 2002 WRC calendar appear on the game.

21 drivers and 7 teams appear on the game. Although Citroën did not participate in a full season in 2002, they are featured on all events in the game and are therefore eligible to score team points in championship mode. Because Colin McRae had his own video game series at this time, Sony could not acquire the license for him to appear, so he was replaced on the game by François Duval.

Production
WRC II Extreme was developed by British-based Evolution Studios and published by Sony Computer Entertainment Europe. The game was designed with a new physics model for the cars controlled by the player. This was developed with assistance for rally motorsport engineers. The geography of the tracks was modeled after satellite photography and DEM data to create a more realistic and accurate look for each rally stage. Audio samples from the engine noises are based on real-life WRC rally cars. The action replay mode editing was developed with the assistance of World Rally Championship broadcaster Chrysalis TV with the editing of the replay footage and GUI design. Each car is made from around 20,000 polygons, an increase from 8000 in the first game.

Reception

WRC II Extreme received "favorable" reviews according to the review aggregation website GameRankings.

References

External links
 

2002 video games
Evolution Studios games
Multiplayer and single-player video games
PlayStation 2 games
PlayStation 2-only games
Sony Interactive Entertainment games
Video games developed in the United Kingdom
World Rally Championship video games